Carlos Andrés Peralta Barrios (born 14 February 1990) is a Colombian professional footballer who last played as a forward for La Equidad.

Career

For the 2015 season, Peralta signed for Colombian second division side Unión Magdalena.

For the 2016 season, he signed for La Equidad in the Colombian top flight.

He is the first professional footballer from San Antero.

References

External links
 

Colombian footballers
Living people
1990 births
Association football forwards
Envigado F.C. players
Leones F.C. footballers
América de Cali footballers
Unión Magdalena footballers
La Equidad footballers
Categoría Primera A players
Categoría Primera B players
People from Córdoba Department